Saint Julius is the name of:

 Pope Julius I (died 352), pope from February 6, 337 to April 12, 352
 See Julius and Aaron (died 304) for Julius, British martyr
 Saint Julius the Veteran, Nicene saint and martyr
 Saint Julius of Novara (330–401), after whom the Saint Julius Island is named
 Saint Julius Island, an island in northern Italy